The 2021 Sam Houston State Bearkats baseball team represented Sam Houston State University during the 2021 NCAA Division I baseball season. The Bearkats played their home games at Don Sanders Stadium and were led by second–year head coach Jay Sirianni. They were members of the Southland Conference. This was Sam Houston State's final year in the Southland as they will be moving to the Western Athletic Conference for the 2022 season.

Preseason

Southland Conference Coaches Poll
The Southland Conference Coaches Poll was released on February 11, 2021 and the Bearkats were picked to finish first in the conference with 276 votes and 17 first place votes.

Preseason All-Southland Team & Honors

First Team
Ryan Flores (UIW, 1st Base)
Nate Fisbeck (MCNS, 2nd Base)
Beau Orlando (UCA, 3rd Base)
JC Correa (LAMR, Shortstop)
Gavin Johnson (SHSU, Catcher)
Clayton Rasbeary (MCNS, Designated Hitter)
Sean Arnold (UIW, Outfielder)
Brandon Bena (HBU, Outfielder)
Colton Cowser (SHSU, Outfielder)
Noah Cameron (UCA, Pitcher)
Will Dion (MCNS, Pitcher)
Kyle Gruller (HBU, Pitcher)
Conner Williams (UCA, Pitcher)
Itchy Burts (TAMUCC, Utility)

Second Team
Preston Faulkner (SELA, 1st Base)
Logan Berlof (LAMR, 2nd Base)
Anthony Quirion (LAMR, 3rd Base)
Reid Bourque (MCNS, Shortstop)
Chris Sandberg (NICH, Catcher)
Lee Thomas (UIW, Designated Hitter)
Josh Ragan (UCA, Outfielder)
Jack Rogers (SHSU, Outfielder)
Tyler Smith (NSU, Outfielder)
John Gaddis (TAMUCC, Pitcher)
Gavin Stone (UCA, Pitcher)
Luke Taggart (UIW, Pitcher)
Jeremy Rodriguez (SFA, Pitcher)
Jake Dickerson (MCNS, Utility)

Roster

Schedule and results

Posteason

Conference Accolades 
Player of the Year: Colton Cowser – SHSU
Hitter of the Year: Colton Eager – ACU
Pitcher of the Year: Will Dion – MCNS
Relief Pitcher of the Year: Tyler Cleveland – UCA
Freshman of the Year: Brennan Stuprich – SELA
Newcomer of the Year: Grayson Tatrow – ACU
Clay Gould Coach of the Year: Rick McCarty – ACU

All Conference First Team
Chase Kemp (LAMR)
Nate Fisbeck (MCNS)
Itchy Burts (TAMUCC)
Bash Randle (ACU)
Mitchell Dickson (ACU)
Lee Thomas (UIW)
Colton Cowser (SHSU)
Colton Eager (ACU)
Clayton Rasbeary (MCNS)
Will Dion (MCNS)
Brennan Stuprich (SELA)
Will Warren (SELA)
Tyler Cleveland (UCA)
Anthony Quirion (LAMR)

All Conference Second Team
Preston Faulkner (SELA)
Daunte Stuart (NSU)
Kasten Furr (UNO)
Evan Keller (SELA)
Skylar Black (SFA)
Tre Obregon III (MCNS)
Jack Rogers (SHSU)
Pearce Howard (UNO)
Grayson Tatrow (ACU)
Chris Turpin (UNO)
John Gaddis (TAMUCC)
Trevin Michael (LAMR)
Caleb Seroski (UNO)
Jacob Burke (SELA)

All Conference Third Team
Luke Marbach (TAMUCC)
Salo Iza (UNO)
Austin Cain (NICH)
Darren Willis (UNO)
Ryan Snell (LAMR)
Tommy Cruz (ACU)
Tyler Finke (SELA)
Payton Harden (MCNS)
Mike Williams (TAMUCC)
Cal Carver (NSU)
Levi David (NSU)
Dominic Robinson (SHSU)
Jack Dallas (LAMR)
Brett Hammit (ACU)

All Conference Defensive Team
Luke Marbach (TAMUCC)
Nate Fisebeck (MCNS)
Anthony Quirion (LAMR)
Darren Willis (UNO)
Gaby Cruz (SELA)
Julian Gonzales (MCNS)
Colton Cowser (SHSU)
Avery George (LAMR)
Will Dion (MCNS)

References:

2021 MLB Draft

References

Sam Houston State Bearkats
Sam Houston Bearkats baseball seasons
Sam Houston State Bearkats baseball